Thorncliffe Park is a neighbourhood in Toronto, Ontario, Canada, in the former Borough of East York.

The City of Toronto recognizes Thorncliffe Park's boundaries as the Don River on the south side; Leaside Bridge, Millwood Road, and Laird Drive on the west side; the West Don River on the east side; and Eglinton Avenue East on the north side.

History

The site of Thorncliffe Park was a farm owned by Robert T. Davies, the wealthy founder of the Dominion Brewing Co. An avid participant in horse racing, under the banner of Thorncliffe Stable, he raced both Thoroughbred and Standardbred horses. After Davies' death in 1916 his estate sold the property to a group of investors from Baltimore, Maryland, who built the Thorncliffe Park Raceway racetrack. The track was home to thoroughbred horse racing and harness racing from 1917 until 1952 when it was sold for real estate development. Today, the old racetrack site is commemorated by two streets named Grandstand Place and Milepost Place and the number of buildings that took on racetrack stable names like Churchill, Maple Glen and Wellow Glen.

The Thorncliffe Ski Jump, located west of the present day Ontario Science Centre, was opened by the Toronto Ski Club in January 1934 and operated until February 1941. Its last recorded event raised funds for the Canadian Red Cross and Norwegian War Aid Fund during World War II.
  
In the 1950s, developers tore down the racetrack and created one of Toronto's first high-rise neighbourhoods. The neighbourhood embodies some standard urban planning ideas of the era – high concentrations of similar housing types, strict separation of retail and residential development, and the assumption that everyone has a car. Low-rise buildings are clustered inside the enclosure created by Thorncliffe Park and Overlea, while high-rise buildings line the outside of Thorncliffe Park. Retail establishments were concentrated in a single shopping mall, now called the East York Town Centre, between the two arms of Thorncliffe Park Drive at Overlea Boulevard. Smaller retail and service plazas have recently opened along Overlea Boulevard. Many residents on Thorncliffe Park Drive are at considerable walking distance from shops, although this problem is mitigated somewhat, even in winter, by well kept sidewalks and walkways and by frequent bus service.

Street names
Some of Thorncliffe Park's street names commemorate a former racetrack located there, or recognize the Town of Leaside's role in the development of the new community.

 Leaside Park Drive – named in 1966, six months before the Town of Leaside's amalgamation into the Borough of East York.
 Beth Nealson Drive – named after Beth Nealson, the last mayor of the Town of Leaside.
 William Morgan Drive – named for Leaside's reeve from 1948 to 1950.
 Banigan Drive – named for an elected member of Town of Leaside's Council from 1951 to 1955.  Banigan was defeated by Charles H. Hiscott in the 1955 election to replace retiring mayor Howard Burrell.
 Pat Moore Drive – named for a Thorncliffe Park resident and community advocate. 
 Patriarch Bartholomew Way – recognizes the Toronto visit of the spiritual leader of Eastern Orthodox Christians, Bartholomew I of Constantinople.

Demographics
According to the 2016 Census, Thorncliffe Park has a population of 21,108, a 9.79% increase from 2011. The top 10 non-English mother tongues are Urdu (24.4%), Pashto (5.1%), Tagalog (Filipino) (4.7%), Persian (4.6%), Gujarati (4.1%), Arabic (3.5%), Bengali (2%), Greek (1.5%), Punjabi (1.4%), and Spanish (1.4%).

Infrastructure

Transportation

Public Transportation
Toronto Transit Commission buses operate in the community.  When the new Line 5 Eglinton line opens, the 81 Thorncliffe Park and 88 South Leaside buses will connect to Science Centre Station and Laird Station, respectively. Thorncliffe Park Station will be a new stop on the Ontario Line, expected to open in 2030.  Metrolinx is also building a maintenance and storage facility in the neighbourhood.  The project requires the relocation of culturally-significant amenities and services, resulting in community members calling for a redesign of the project locally.

Roads
The Overlea Bridge, formally known as the Charles H. Hiscott Bridge, was built in 1960 to cross the west branch of the Don River and connect Overlea Boulevard to Don Mills Road, linking Thorncliffe Park to Flemingdon Park.  The bridge was named for former mayor of Leaside Charles Henry Hiscott (1956 to 1961). 
Reconstruction is planned for the 2022-2025 period as part of the Renewing Overlea Boulevard project and will included widened sidewalks, the addition of cycle tracks and public art.

Education

Schools operated by the Toronto District School Board in Thorncliffe Park include Thorncliffe Park Public School, Fraser Mustard Early Learning Academy, Valley Park Middle School, and Marc Garneau Collegiate Institute.

Recreation
Toronto Parks, Forestry & Recreation (PF&R) manages the Jenner Jean-Marie Community Centre and is responsible for the maintenance of R.V. Burgess Park, Leaside Park and Outdoor Pool, and E.T. Seton Park, which is a part of the Toronto Ravine System. The Thorncliffe branch of the Toronto Public Library operates in the neighbourhood. Leaside Park is home to the Thorncliffe Park Tennis Club.

In culture
The neighbourhood has been depicted in the films Arrowhead and Concrete Valley.

Notable people
Michael Bliss, historian, author and Officer of the Order of Canada. 
True Davidson, former mayor of East York.
William Dennison, former mayor of Toronto.
Peter Lynch, Canadian filmmaker.
Robert Baird McClure, medical missionary and Moderator of the United Church of Canada. 
Beth Nealson, former mayor of Leaside.
Alan Redway, former mayor of East York, and former Member of Parliament for Don Valley East and York East.

References

External links
Thorncliffe Park neighbourhood profile data (City of Toronto)
Tales from the towers - a 10 Part series on Thorncliffe Park - Globe & Mail 2003
A food tour of Thorncliffe Park - Toronto Star  - Feb 27, 2008

Neighbourhoods in Toronto
Ethnic enclaves in Ontario